Enveloped Ideas may refer to:

Enveloped Ideas, a tribute album
Enveloped Ideas, a song by Filipino rock band The Dawn